Georgi Nemsadze (born 10 May 1972) is a Georgian former professional football  midfielder and manager. In addition to Georgian teams, he played for many European clubs such as Trabzonspor, Grasshopper Club Zürich, AC Reggiana and Dundee.

Nemsadze is revered and beloved by Dundee F.C. fans for his football ability and consistently good form while at the club. He received numerous praise from independent Scottish football pundits and journalists; while Nemsadze also received plaudits from opposition fans in retrospect.

He played for the Georgia national team between 1992 and 2004, and was capped 69 times.

Nemsadze was inducted into the Dundee F.C. Hall of Fame, and received the International Award, in 2010.

He played for Dundee F.C. in the 2015 Julián Speroni Testimonial versus Crystal Palace F.C. at Selhurst Park in London.

In July 2021 Nemsadze quit football and joined politics as a candidate of the ruling party in the municipal elections.

References

External links

Appearances for Georgia National Team

1972 births
Living people
Association football midfielders
Footballers from Georgia (country)
Georgia (country) international footballers
Expatriate footballers from Georgia (country)
Scottish Premier League players
Dundee F.C. players
Trabzonspor footballers
FC 08 Homburg players
Expatriate sportspeople from Georgia (country) in Turkey
A.C. Reggiana 1919 players
Grasshopper Club Zürich players
FC Guria Lanchkhuti players
FC Dinamo Tbilisi players
Süper Lig players
Serie B players
Expatriate footballers in Italy
Expatriate footballers in Turkey
Expatriate footballers in Scotland
Expatriate footballers in Switzerland
Expatriate footballers in Germany